Miri-ye Khani may refer to:
 Miri-ye Khani 1
 Miri-ye Khani 2